The 2001 Overseas Final was the twenty-first and last running of the Overseas Final. The Final was held at the Poole Stadium in Poole, England on 17 June and was open to riders from the North American Final and the Australian, British, New Zealand and South African Championships.

2001 Overseas Final
17 June
 Poole, Poole Stadium
Qualification: Top 8 plus 1 reserve to the Intercontinental Final in Västervik, Sweden

References

See also
 Motorcycle Speedway

2001
World Individual
Overseas Final